"Brüder, zur Sonne, zur Freiheit" (Brothers, to the sun, to freedom) is the title of the German re-writing of the Russian work song Brave, comrades, in step!, which Leonid Petrovich Radin wrote during 1895/96 in Moscow while he was in Taganka Prison.

History 
Radin used the student song Slowly moving time , to which Ivan Sawvich Nikitin wrote the text in September 1857, published in 1858 under the title  ("song") in the Russian magazine Russian Conversation . Radin also changed the rhythm of the previous slow waltz melody to a brisk and combative march.

The song was first sung by political prisoners on the march to the Siberian exile in 1898. The song quickly became known for its rousing nature, but also because of the origin of its melody: In the 1905 Russian Revolution and the October Revolution 1917 it became an anthem in Russia. Radin himself never experienced either; he died in 1900 at the age of 39.

The German conductor Hermann Scherchen, director of a workers' choir, learned the song in Russian captivity in 1917 and created a German version in 1918. In Germany, it was sung for the first time on September 21, 1920, in Berlin by the "Schubert Choir". While Radin wrote seven stanzas, Scherchen's German version only included three. During the time of the Weimar Republic a fourth and a fifth stanza by unknown authors were written.

In 1921 the song even appeared in a religious hymn book. The Sonnenlieder edited by Eberhard Arnold, until today the hymn book of the Pacifist Anabaptist Bruderhofgemeinschaft (Brotherhood Community), uses the song as Hymn 63. The last line of the third stanza was, however, changed by Erich Mohr (1895–1960). For Hermann Scherchen, the German translator of the workers' song, the final verse is "Brothers, now the hands united to one, / Brothers, laughing at death! / Forever, the slavery is at an end, / holy be the last battle!"; in the Sun Songs the last verse reads "Holy be the Love Power!"

The National Socialists used the popular song on the one hand with a specially adapted fourth stanza, on the other hand, in 1927, it was converted to "Brothers in Pits and Mines", one of the best known propaganda songs in Nazi Germany, and also in 1927 in "Brothers Form the Columns", a song by the SA. In the propaganda song "Volk ans Gewehr" ("People to the rifle!"), the first line also refers to this song with "... a sign of freedom to the sun".

It developed over the decades into the probably most sung song of the workers' movement after the Second World War. In addition to "When we go side by side", it is the party anthem of the Social Democratic Party of Germany and is used at the end of each SPD party congress, but also had its place at the party meetings of the Socialist Unity Party of Germany.

On June 17, 1953, the song was sung in many of the demonstrations in East Germany. It was also sung at the Monday Demonstations of 1989 in Leipzig.

There are many translations in other European languages.

Melody

Literature 
 Eckhard John: Brüder zur Sonne, zur Freiheit. Die unerhörte Geschichte eines Revolutionsliedes. Ch. Links Verlag, Berlin 2018,

References

External links 
 Text des russischen Originalliedes mit einer Aufnahme desselben (Russian)"

Songs about freedom
Political songs
1895 songs